32aam Adhyayam 23aam Vaakyam (English: 32nd Chapter 23rd Verse) is a 2015 Indian Malayalam mystery-thriller film, starring Govind Padmasoorya, Miya, and Lal. It was co-written and co-directed by Arjun Prabhakaran and Gokul Ramakrishnan and was released on 19 June 2015.

Plot 
The story revolves around a young couple, Freddy Abraham (Govind Padmasoorya) and Ann (Miya), who marry against the wishes of their parents. They are on the verge of celebrating their first wedding anniversary. Ann is a journalist, a dedicated one at that who is adept at digging out the trickiest of mysteries, while Freddy is an engineer returning from America to celebrate their first wedding anniversary. Ann's friend gifts them a book for their wedding anniversary. Freddy starts to read the book as he is fed up of playing games and watching TV as Ann has gone to work. The title of the book is "John Ryan" by Noah. Freddy is interested in the story and finds a similarity with the protagonist of the story. Freddy starts imagining himself in the position of protagonist in the story. 

The Protagonist is a digital photographer who photoshoots for actress and models. One day he notices his model is very dull. When asked, she said that she is afraid of the number 23. The number 23 makes her fear for everything and she said that today is her 23rd birthday and also said that she will not live after today. As said, she died the next day. This creates an confusion and fear in the mind of the protagonist. He, then explains everything to his wife, Lucia but she doesn't believe this. The next day, he resigns his job because of a fight with the head of the firm and comes back to his home. He, then realised that his  wife and the company's head has an affair. Every time when he is not in the house, the head would come to the home. So, the protagonist kills his wife and he committed suicide.  

Now in the present, Freddy understands that the story has took place in

Cast 
 Govind Padmasoorya - Freddy Abraham/John Ryan
 Miya - Ann Mathews/Lucia
 Lal - Ravi uncle/R.K. Varma
 Arjun Nandhakumar - Kiran
 Sunil Sugatha - Koya
 Sasi Kalinga - Narayanan
 Karthik Ramakrishnan - College Lecturer
 Gouri - Mia
 Sasha Gopinath - Zara
 P Balachandran - Noaha
 Balachandran Chullikadu: Senior Doctor
 Kalabhavan Rahman: Kappyar
 Vijayan Karanthoor: Police Officer
 Aashiq : Special appearance

Soundtrack 

The film's soundtrack was composed by Bijibal. The lyrics were written by Anu Elizabeth Jose and Santhosh Varma.

Critical reception 
Times of India stated, "The debutant filmmakers take the audience for a reasonably-wondrous trip into the maze of its story, filled with mystery and revelations. … The film is a decent watch." Mollywood times stated, "Altogether, 32aam Adhyayam 23aam Vaakyam is a gift that wrapped neatly and skillfully with suspense." Ytalkies stated that the film is "a watchable thriller, fairly well-made … could have been better if it was a bit faster … [and had] decent performances". Nowrunning stated, "'32aam Adhyaayam 23aam Vaakyam' fails to shake off the awkwardness and plasticity that makes it a leap to nowhere." Indiaglitz stated, "It lacks something vital, and one feels a forcing of circumstances to give it a mysterious air. This is the movie's undoing, but '32 aam adhyayam 23 aam vakyam' is surely a once time enjoyable watch." Muyals.com rated the movie 3.25 out of 5 and stated, "32aam Adhyayam 23aam Vaakyam stands as a good, as well as unexpected thriller movie; with an above average first half and an unexpected take off to a higher level in the latter half." Chandra Mohan Gopinath of Movie Street stated, "the movie doesn't fall flat but end up as an average one".

References

External links 
 

2015 films
2015 thriller drama films
2010s mystery thriller films
Indian thriller drama films
2010s Malayalam-language films
Indian mystery thriller films
Films scored by Bijibal
2015 drama films